

References

Karađorđević
Karađorđević